The following is a list of 2017 box office number-one films in France. Screen Daily described the year as "fairly typical" for the French box office, noting that like the previous five years, the top 20 was dominated by American made, family-oriented animated features including Despicable Me 3, The Boss Baby and Sing as well as mainstream French comedies (Alibi.com and Raid dingue) and Hollywood franchises such as Pirates Of The Caribbean, Star Wars and Guardians of the Galaxy.

Screen Daily declared the only film to buck a world-wide trend in the box-office was Valerian and the City of a Thousand Planets making it one of the most popular releases of the year drawing four million spectators for a gross of $30.4 million. The film still was still not as popular as Besson's most successful French releases to date, The Big Blue, which generated nine million admissions, and The Fifth Element, which drew seven million spectators.

References

2017
France
2017 in French cinema